Lone Star (formerly, Lonestar) is an unincorporated community in Fresno County, California.

The Lonestar post office operated from 1891 to 1895 and from 1900 to 1910. The place was named by the first settlers after their former home state, Texas (the Lone Star State).

References

Unincorporated communities in California
Unincorporated communities in Fresno County, California